Charles Tracey Stagg (December 16, 1878 – July 14, 1939) was an American lawyer, law professor and politician from New York.

Life
He was born on December 16, 1878, in Elmira, Chemung County, New York. He graduated from Cornell Law School in 1902. He was admitted to the bar, and was confidential clerk of Walter Lloyd Smith, Presiding Justice of the Appellate Division (3rd Dept.), until 1904. Then he practiced law in Elmira, and later in Ithaca. In November 1908, he became instructor in procedure, and in April 1909 assistant professor of law, at Cornell Law School.

He was appointed as Counsel to the Governor by Nathan L. Miller. In April 1922, he was appointed as Deputy New York State Commissioner of Conservation.

Stagg was a member of the New York State Senate (41st D.) from 1935 until his death in 1939, sitting in the 158th, 159th, 160th, 161st and 162nd New York State Legislatures.

He committed suicide on July 14, 1939, in the woods of Newfield, New York, about eight miles from his home in Ithaca, by shooting a bullet in his head. In a note to his son Norman G. Stagg (later Tompkins County Judge), he complained about failing health and excessive work as a legislator.

Sources

1878 births
1939 deaths
Republican Party New York (state) state senators
Politicians from Elmira, New York
American politicians who committed suicide
Suicides by firearm in New York (state)
Politicians from Ithaca, New York
Cornell Law School alumni
1939 suicides